Brändle or Brandle is a surname. Notable individuals with the surname include:

 Daniel Brändle (born 1992), Liechtensteiner international footballer who plays as a midfielder
 Joseph E. Brandle (1839–1909), American soldier who received the Medal of Honor during the American Civil War
 Kurt Brändle (1912–1943), German Luftwaffe military aviator during World War II
 Matthias Brändle (born 1989), Austrian professional road bicycle racer
 Pola Brändle (born 1980), German artist

See also
Brindle